Although a concerto is usually a piece of music for one or more solo instruments accompanied by a full orchestra, several composers have written works with the apparently contradictory title Concerto for Orchestra. This title is usually chosen to emphasise soloistic and virtuosic treatment of various individual instruments or sections in the orchestra, with emphasis on instruments changing during the piece. It differs from sinfonia concertante in that it has no soloist or group of soloists that remains the same throughout the composition.

A well known concerto for orchestra is Béla Bartók's Concerto for Orchestra (1943), although the title had been used several times before. Goffredo Petrassi made the concerto for orchestra something of a speciality, writing eight of them since 1933. He finished the last one in 1972.

For symphony orchestra 
This list is chronological.
Concerto for Orchestra, Op. 38, by Paul Hindemith (1925)
Concerto for Orchestra, by Lucijan Marija Škerjanc (1926)
Concerto for Orchestra, by Vagn Holmboe (1929)
Concerto for Orchestra, by Tadeusz Szeligowski (1930)
Concerto for Orchestra, Op. 43, by Adolf Busch (published 1931)
Concerto for Orchestra, by Gian Francesco Malipiero (1931)
Concerto for Orchestra, Op. 24, by Knudåge Riisager (1931)
Philharmonic Concerto, by Paul Hindemith (1932)
Concerto per orchestra in Do maggiore, by Mario Pilati (1933)
Concerto for Orchestra, by Walter Piston (1933), which is based in part on Hindemith's work
Concerto for Orchestra, by Goffredo Petrassi (1934)
Concerto per orchestra, Op. 61, by Alfredo Casella (1937)
Concerto for Orchestra, by Zoltán Kodály (1939–40)
Concerto for Orchestra (Based on Red Army Themes), by Richard Mohaupt (1942–43)
Concerto for Orchestra, by Béla Bartók (1943)
Concerto No. 1 for Orchestra 'Arevakal', Op. 88, by Alan Hovhaness (1951)
Concerto No. 2 for Orchestra, by Goffredo Petrassi (1951)
Concerto No. 4 for Orchestra, Op. 98, No. 2, by Alan Hovhaness (1952)
Concerto No. 7 for Orchestra, Op. 116, by Alan Hovhaness (1953)
Concerto No. 3 for Orchestra, by Goffredo Petrassi (1953)
Concerto for Orchestra, by Tadeusz Baird (1953)
Concerto for Orchestra, by Witold Lutosławski (1950–54), which won him the UNESCO 1st prize in 1963.
Concerto for Orchestra, "À Darius Milhaud" by Alexandre Tansman (1954)
Concerto No. 4 for Orchestra, by Goffredo Petrassi (1954)
Concerto for Orchestra, by Anatol Vieru (1954-55)
Concerto No. 5 for Orchestra, by Goffredo Petrassi (1955)
Concerto No. 8 for Orchestra, Op. 117, by Alan Hovhaness (1957)
Concerto No. 6 for Orchestra, by Goffredo Petrassi (1957)
Concerto for Orchestra, by Giya Kancheli (1961)
Concerto for Orchestra, by Grażyna Bacewicz (1962)
Concerto for Orchestra, by Michael Tippett (1962–63)
Concerto No. 7 for Orchestra, by Goffredo Petrassi (1963–64)
Concerto for Orchestra No. 1, Naughty Limericks, by Rodion Shchedrin (1963)
Métaboles, by Henri Dutilleux (1964)
Concerto for Orchestra, by Havergal Brian (1964)
Concerto for Orchestra, by Robert Gerhard (1965)
Concerto for Orchestra No. 1, Gala Music, by Gunther Schuller (1966)
Concerto for Orchestra, Op. 8, by Robin Holloway (1967)
Concerto for Orchestra, by Thea Musgrave (1967)
Concerto for Orchestra No. 2, The Chimes, by Rodion Shchedrin (1968)
Concerto for Orchestra by Oliver Knussen (1969)
Concerto for Orchestra, by Elliott Carter (1969)
Concerto for Orchestra, by Dimitar Tapkoff (1969)
Concerto for Orchestra by Aleksandra Pakhmutova (1971)
Concerto No. 8 for Orchestra, by Goffredo Petrassi (1970–72)
Concerto for orchestra, by Anthony Payne (1974)
Philharmonic Concerto, Op. 120, by Malcolm Arnold (1976)
Concerto for Orchestra No. 2, by Gunther Schuller (1976)
Second Concerto for Orchestra, Op. 40, by Robin Holloway (1978)
Concerto Festivo, for orchestra without conductor, by Andrzej Panufnik (1979)
Concerto for Orchestra, by Roger Sessions (1979–81), which won him the Pulitzer Prize for Music in 1982.
Concerto for Orchestra (Suite), by Alexandre Tansman (1981)
Concerto for Orchestra, by John McCabe (1982)
Concerto for Orchestra, by Stephen Paulus (1983)
Concerto for Orchestra, by Edward Gregson (1983) (revised versions 1989 and 2001)
Concerto for Orchestra, by Robert Saxton (1984)
Concerto for Orchestra No. 3, Farbenspiel, by Gunther Schuller (1985)
Concerto for Orchestra, by Alun Hoddinott (1986)
Concerto for Orchestra, by Karel Husa (1986)
Concerto for Orchestra No. 1, by Steven Stucky (1986–87)
Concerto for Orchestra, by Leonard Bernstein (1986–89), which is also known as "Jubilee Games" for orchestra and baritone.
Third Concerto for Orchestra, Op. 80, by Robin Holloway (1981–94)
Concerto for Orchestra (Variations without a theme), by Denys Bouliane (1985–95)
Concerto for Orchestra No. 3, Old Russian Circus Music, by Rodion Shchedrin (1989)
Concerto for Orchestra No. 4, Round Dances (Khorovody), by Rodion Shchedrin (1989)
Concerto for Orchestra, by Joan Tower (1991)
Concerto for Orchestra – Zoroastrian Riddles, by Richard Danielpour (1996)
Strathclyde Concerto No. 10: Concerto for Orchestra, by Peter Maxwell Davies (1996)
Concerto for Orchestra No. 5, Four Russian Songs, by Rodion Shchedrin (1998)
Concerto for Orchestra (reseated), by Augusta Read Thomas (1998)
Concerto for Orchestra, by Stanisław Skrowaczewski (1999)
Boston Concerto, by Elliott Carter (2002)
Concerto for Orchestra by Jennifer Higdon (2002)
Yi°: Concerto for Orchestra, by Tan Dun (2002)
Concerto for Orchestra, Op. 81 by Lowell Liebermann (2002)
Concerto for Orchestra, by Magnus Lindberg (2003)
Second Concerto for Orchestra, by Steven Stucky (2003), which won him the Pulitzer Prize for Music in 2005
Concerto for Orchestra, by David Horne (2003–04)
Concerti for Orchestra, by Milton Babbitt (2004)
Concierto para orquestra, by Agustí Charles (2004)
Fourth Concerto for Orchestra, Op. 101 by Robin Holloway (2004–06)
Concerto for Orchestra, by Christopher Rouse (2007–2008)
Concerto for Orchestra, by Rolf Martinsson (2008)
Symphony No. 5 (Concerto for Orchestra), by Ellen Taaffe Zwilich (2008)
Fifth Concerto for Orchestra, Op. 107, by Robin Holloway (2009–10)
Morning in Long Island, Concert No. 1 for orchestra, by Pascal Dusapin (2011)
Concerto for Orchestra, by Marc Neikrug (2012)
Morpheus, by Søren Nils Eichberg (2012)
Godai; The five elements, Concerto for orchestra (2012–13) by Benjamin Staern
, by Thierry Escaich (2014)
Concerto for Orchestra, by Zhou Tian (2015)
Concerto for Orchestra, by André Previn (2016)
SPIRA, by Unsuk Chin (2019)

For string orchestra 
Concerto for Strings in G major, RV 151, Concerto alla rustica, by Antonio Vivaldi (between the mid-1720s and 1730)
Concerto for Double String Orchestra (1938–39), by Michael Tippett
Concerto in D (1946), by Igor Stravinsky
Concerto for String Orchestra (1948), by Grażyna Bacewicz
Concerto for String Orchestra (1949), by Alan Rawsthorne
Concerto for String Orchestra No. 1 (1949–50), by Allan Pettersson
Concerto for String Orchestra No. 2 (1956), by Allan Pettersson
Concerto for String Orchestra No. 3 (1956–57), by Allan Pettersson
Concerto per archi (1964–65, nuova revisione 1977) by Nino Rota
Concerto per corde (1966), by Alberto Ginastera

For chamber orchestra 
Chamber Concerto for Piano and Violin with 13 Wind Instruments (1923–25), by Alban Berg
Concerto for Chamber Orchestra (1932), by George Antheil
Chamber Concerto, for 13 instrumentalists (1969–70), by György Ligeti
Kammerkonzert (1973) by Manfred Trojahn
Concerto for Orchestra (1999), by John Woolrich
Asko Concerto (2000), by Elliott Carter
Rain of Tears (2006), by Chinary Ung

For wind orchestra 

 Concerto for Wind Orchestra, by Colin McPhee (1959)
 Concerto for Wind Orchestra, Op. 41, by Nikolai Lopatnikoff (1963)
 Concierto para banda: 1.Allegro, 2.Lento, 3.Allegro, by Amando Blanquer Ponsoda (1970-71)

References 

 
Lists of musical works